Mohamed-Amine Tayeb (born 28 September 1985) is an Algerian judoka. He competed at the 2016 Summer Olympics in the +100 kg event.

References

External links
 
 

1985 births
Living people
Algerian male judoka
Olympic judoka of Algeria
Judoka at the 2016 Summer Olympics
Competitors at the 2018 Mediterranean Games
Mediterranean Games competitors for Algeria
21st-century Algerian people
20th-century Algerian people